Scrobipalpuloides elaborata is a moth in the family Gelechiidae. It was described by Povolný in 2000. It is found in North America, where it has been recorded from Nevada.

References

Scrobipalpuloides
Moths described in 2000